William Biddle Shepard (May 14, 1799 – June 20, 1852) was a congressional representative from North Carolina; born in New Bern, North Carolina, May 14, 1799; completed preparatory studies; attended the University of North Carolina at Chapel Hill in 1813; was graduated from the University of Pennsylvania at Philadelphia; studied law; was admitted to the bar and commenced practice in Camden County, North Carolina, later removing to Elizabeth City, North Carolina; also engaged in banking; elected to the Twenty-first through Twenty-third Congresses and elected as a Whig to the Twenty-fourth Congress (March 4, 1829 – March 3, 1837); chairman, Committee on District of Columbia (Twenty-fourth Congress); was not a candidate for renomination in 1836; member of the state senate 1838-1840 and 1848–1850; member of the board of trustees of the University of North Carolina 1838–1852; died in Elizabeth City, N.C., June 20, 1852; interment in St. Paul's Churchyard, Edenton, North Carolina.

See also
Twenty-first United States Congress
Twenty-second United States Congress
Twenty-third United States Congress
Twenty-fourth United States Congress

External links 
 
 

North Carolina state senators
1799 births
1852 deaths
North Carolina Whigs
19th-century American politicians
Politicians from New Bern, North Carolina
National Republican Party members of the United States House of Representatives from North Carolina
People from Elizabeth City, North Carolina
University of Pennsylvania Law School alumni